Kurts is a Latvian masculine give name as well as a surname of various origins.

As a given name
Kurts Fridrihsons (1911–1991), Latvian painter, illustrator and Anti-Soviet dissident
Kurts Klāsens (1895—1973), Latvian sports sailor
Kurts Plade (1898–1945), Latvian footballer

As a surname
Alwyn Kurts (1915–2000), Australian actor

References

Latvian masculine given names